Fraudulent concealment is a common law doctrine that may be invoked to toll a statute of limitations.

Common law